The Ontario Universities' Application Centre (OUAC) is a non-profit organization based in Guelph that processes online applications for admission to universities in Ontario, Canada. It was founded in 1971 by the Council of Ontario Universities and the Ontario Universities' Council on Admissions, to reduce the duplication and costs involved in processing applications.

The OUAC processes applications to undergraduate programs, medical school, law school, teacher education, and rehabilitation sciences programs at nearly all of Ontario's 21 universities - only the RMC does not process applications through the OUAC.

History

The OUAC was founded in 1971 by the Committee of Presidents of the Universities of Ontario, now called the Council of Ontario Universities, and the Ontario Universities’ Council on Admissions (OUCA).

Before the OUAC was formed, each university processed its own applications. Students could accept offers of admission to more than one university, which left universities with vacant spots in the fall (since students were not required to notify the universities they had decided not to attend). Processing all applications in one place meant less duplication and costs. Since the 1970s, the OUAC has expanded its services to include publications, transcript distribution, surveys, data collection and statistical reports used by governments and universities.

In 1972, the OUAC processed more than 135,000 undergraduate applications. Today, more than 200,000 applicants submit approximately 600,000 applications to the OUAC every year. By 2012, the OUAC had processed more than 14 million applications, submitted by more than 4.5 million applicants.

Starting in 1975, the OUAC began processing applications to professional programs, including medicine (1975), teacher education (1979), law (1997) and rehabilitation sciences (2000). Each program has its own application service. These services were developed by admissions officers at the respective universities to reduce duplication and save time and money for the applicants and the universities.

In 2003, during the double cohort year when the last group of Grade 13 students graduated at the same time as Grade 12 students, the OUAC received 86,000 online applications in two months.

Applications were paper-based until the late 1990s. By 2011, 99 percent of all applications were completed online.

Funding

The OUAC is a non-profit agency funded through student application fees and the contract services it provides for the universities. After all costs are recovered, the OUAC gives any remaining revenue to the universities to help with their admissions processing costs.

Primary role

The OUAC processes English and French applications for undergraduate and professional programs (medicine, law, teacher education, and rehabilitation sciences), and graduate programs at some universities in Ontario.

Secondary roles
 Maintaining the Ontario Universities' Info website (in English and French), a searchable database of information on all Ontario university programs, including admission requirements, scholarships, etc.
 Overseeing the Ontario Universities’ Fair (OUF), a three-day event held each fall in Toronto. All 21 Ontario universities are exhibitors at this event, where students and parents can learn about university life.
 Coordinating the Ontario Universities' Regional Fairs, a series of events held each fall in cities and towns across Ontario. Representatives from the universities make presentations and speak to students, parents and educators.
 Providing online tools that allow Ontario high school guidance counsellors and school officials to access student information in the OUAC database and exchange it with universities. Users can create student accounts, submit grades, update academic files, view completed applications, etc.
 Maintaining the Ontario Universities’ Electronic Transcript System (OUETS), where students can request, through the OUAC website, to have copies of their academic transcripts (from Ontario universities and colleges) sent to any Ontario university.

Application types

The OUAC processes all undergraduate and professional applications on behalf of Ontario’s universities (except the Royal Military College of Canada). Applicants submit their application to the OUAC, indicating all choices they wish to apply for. The OUAC does not make any admission decisions.

Undergraduate
The OUAC forwards undergraduate applications to all requested universities and/or programs. Depending on the applicant’s current situation, either the 101 or 105 online applications are used.

Professional
The OUAC processes applications for professional programs at Ontario universities (medicine, law, teacher education, and rehabilitation sciences). While the OUAC processes the applications, it does not make any admission decisions.

The Ontario Law School Application Service (OLSAS) processes applications for admission to Ontario’s law schools. For York University, the application is for the Osgoode Hall Law School.

The Ontario Medical School Application Service (OMSAS) processes applications for admission to Ontario’s medical schools. For Lakehead University and Laurentian University, the application is for the jointly operated Northern Ontario School of Medicine. For McMaster University, it is for the Michael G. DeGroote School of Medicine, and for Western University, it is for the Schulich School of Medicine & Dentistry.

The Ontario Rehabilitation Sciences Programs Application Service (ORPAS) processes applications to occupational therapy, physiotherapy and physical therapy, audiology and speech-language pathology programs offered at the graduate level at some Ontario universities.

The Teacher Education Application Service (TEAS) processes applications for admission to Ontario’s faculties of education.

+RMCC offers undergraduate programs; but the applications are not processed by the OUAC.

See also
 List of Ontario Universities
 Ontario College Application Service

References

External links
 Ontario Universities' Application Centre

Universities in Ontario
University and college admissions